Sabri Jaballah (born 28 June 1973) is a Tunisian footballer.

He played for a few clubs, including Club Africain, CS Sfaxien and Stade Tunisien.

He played for the Tunisia national football team and was a participant at the 1998 FIFA World Cup.

References 

1973 births
Living people
Tunisian footballers
1998 FIFA World Cup players
Footballers at the 1996 Summer Olympics
Olympic footballers of Tunisia
Tunisia international footballers
1996 African Cup of Nations players
1998 African Cup of Nations players
Association football defenders
AS Marsa players
Club Africain players
CS Sfaxien players
EO Goulette et Kram players